Paulo Roberto Jamelli Júnior (born 22 July 1974), known as Jamelli, is a Brazilian retired footballer who played mainly as a forward.

Football career
Born in São Paulo, Jamelli made his professional debuts with hometown side São Paulo, appearing in seven Série A games. He first made his presence felt with Santos FC, scoring 13 goals during two seasons.

Having attracted the attention of clubs abroad, Jamelli moved to Kashiwa Reysol in Japan but, in January 1998, switched to Spain's Real Zaragoza as the Aragonese had lost in the previous summer Dani García and Fernando Morientes, both to Real Madrid. Never an undisputed starter, he was almost always a very important attacking element, scoring a career-best 13 La Liga goals in the 2000–01 campaign, precisely the year of the side's conquest of the Copa del Rey, where he netted in the final against Celta de Vigo (3–1).

After Zaragoza's 2002 relegation, Jamelli started off in the second level, but eventually returned to Brazil in January 2003 by joining Corinthians. He ended his career in 2006, after one-season spells with Shimizu S-Pulse, UD Almería, Corinthians, Atlético Mineiro and Grêmio Prudente.

In 2008, Jamelli joined Coritiba as a technical coordinator. However, on 1 April of the following year, he left the post due to personal problems with coach Ivo Wortmann.

Career statistics

Club

International

Honours
Zaragoza
Copa del Rey: 2000–01

References

External links
 
 
 
 

1974 births
Living people
Brazilian people of Italian descent
Footballers from São Paulo
Brazilian footballers
Association football forwards
Campeonato Brasileiro Série A players
São Paulo FC players
Santos FC players
Sport Club Corinthians Paulista players
Clube Atlético Mineiro players
J1 League players
Kashiwa Reysol players
Shimizu S-Pulse players
La Liga players
Segunda División players
Real Zaragoza players
UD Almería players
Brazil international footballers
Brazilian expatriate footballers
Expatriate footballers in Japan
Expatriate footballers in Spain
Brazilian expatriate sportspeople in Japan
Brazilian expatriate sportspeople in Spain
Brazilian football managers
1996 CONCACAF Gold Cup players